Raymond Wright (born May 20, 1947) is an American rower. He competed in the men's coxless four event at the 1968 Summer Olympics.

References

External links
 

1947 births
Living people
American male rowers
Olympic rowers of the United States
Rowers at the 1968 Summer Olympics
Rowers from Seattle